The North Borneo War Monument is a monument that was erected on 8 May 1923 by the North Borneo Chartered Company in Bond Street, Jesselton, British North Borneo. Originally, it was a memorial for the fallen British soldiers during the World War I but later extended to include the Australian soldiers in World War II. The monument stands today in the city park of Kota Kinabalu, the capital of the Malaysian state of Sabah.

History 

The monument was originally erected in Bond Street (now Gaya Street). Due to the shifting of the KK City Park in the 1970s, the monument had undergone changes in form and height. In addition, the bronze plaque on the obelisk and a plaque at the site of previous gun were extended.

Original shape 
The monument originally consisted of an approximately  obelisk of granite and a cannon that were placed each on their own narrow rectangular base with semicircular ends. Both bases were mounted on a second common base.

Today's form 
The shape of the obelisk was not changed, but the original unit of the base plate is no longer given. The cannon base was placed about 3 metres from the obelisk, but without a gun. There is now a plaque instead of the gun.

Original inscription 

The original decoration included a carved in the stone relief in the form of a laurel wreath with the inscription, To The Glorious Dead 1914–1918 and a marble slab in the second pyramid stone. The marble plaque lists the names of 13 fallen of the First World War to:

Extensions 
On the opposite side of the marble slab (west) was a bronze plaque mounted with the following inscription:

The identical text is in gold lettering on a black plate on the earlier cannon base.

On the north side of the obelisk is a memorial plaque to the victims during the time which was Confrontation attached.

Inauguration 
As of 8 May 1923 by 10 o'clock in the morning, the ceremony of the inauguration of the monument was held by Major-general Sir Neill Malcolm. Among the guests were the Governor Sir William Rycroft, Admiral Arthur Leveson, the Bishop of Labuan and Sarawak and Ms Stotter. Bishop Danson dedicated the obelisk and made a speech of greetings on behalf from the representatives of the Catholics, Muslims and Sikhs, along with the speech from Sir Neill Malcolm.

In popular culture 
As a remembering to the former site of the monument in Bond Street, There was an exhibition been held in 2012, with the theme "Bonding with Gaya Street (BGS)".

Perhaps due to the establishment of the De Fontaine Memorial in 1912, the shape of the North Borneo War Memorial was very similar with it.

References

Notes 

Buildings and structures in Kota Kinabalu
Monuments and memorials in Sabah